"All I Have to Give" is a song by American boy band Backstreet Boys, produced and written by Full Force, and released as the third and final single from their second album Backstreet's Back and the sixth and final single from their US debut album. The single debuted at number two on the UK Singles Chart and peaked at number five on the US Billboard Hot 100, becoming their third top-10 single in the US, following "Everybody (Backstreet's Back)".

Background
Alongside working with Max Martin for their second album, Backstreet's Back, the Backstreet Boys began collaborating with Full Force in late 1996 as a way to differentiate themselves from the pop and R&B genre. In a 2017 interview with Billboard, Howie Dorough discussed how the song was particularly significant to him:My sound wasn’t exactly the lead-person sound for the group with these songs. "All I Have To Give" was me finally getting a chance to step to the plate and show the world who I am as a singer. I’ll always be thankful for producers from the group Full Force for saying, "Dude, why don’t you sing more on the leads?"

Critical reception
Chuck Taylor of Billboard noted that "All I Have to Give" contained "plush harmonies, a melody that seems altogether natural and familiar on the first listen, and clever production props", describing it as a "no-brainer ballad" that would treat the Backstreet Boys more seriously as men. Daily Record described the song as a "classic slice of teen-pop", stating that the Backstreet Boys were "eclipsing Boyzone". People described "All I Have to Give" as a "peppy" ballad, stating that while the song contained "a tinge of melancholy in the group's harmonies, one can't help smiling". Bob Waliszewski of Plugged In stated that the song expresses a "willingness to do whatever it takes to forge a strong relationship".

Commercial performance
"All I Have to Give" charted in the top ten in several countries, including a debut at number 2 on the UK Singles Chart, number 3 in Canada, number 4 in Australia, and number 8 in Germany during 1998. It also reached number one in Spain and on the UK Indie Chart.

In the US, the song reached number 5 on the Billboard Hot 100 on February 6, 1999. It has since been certified Platinum in the US and Australia, Gold in New Zealand and Sweden, and Silver in the UK.

Music video

Background
The music video was directed by Nigel Dick and released in 1998. It uses the song's radio edit, omitting the latter-half of the song's bridge. As of April 2021, the video has over 51 million views on YouTube.

Synopsis
Throughout the music video, the Backstreet Boys perform in various interior locations while wearing different outfits. These include a circular wall, a brown stage, a bar, in front of a steel structure, and in a blue-lit room. During the verse, every band member is seen singing in front of a microphone while wearing urban clothing; Nick Carter and Brian Littrell sing the first two verses, while Howie Dorough and AJ McLean perform the next two verses. During the chorus, they simultaneously perform a "hat dance", while wearing a fedora and multicolored-collar suits throughout the choreography.

Track listings

 US CD single
 "All I Have to Give" (album version) – 4:36
 "All I Have to Give" (Part II—The Conversation Mix) – 4:15

 US maxi-CD single
 "All I Have to Give (album version) – 4:36
 "All I Have to Give (Part II—The Conversation Mix) – 4:15
 "All I Have to Give (Davidson Ospina Radio Mix) – 4:22
 "All I Have to Give (Soul Solution Radio Mix) – 3:40
 "Quit Playing Games (with My Heart)" (live version) – 6:08

 UK and European CD1 single
 "All I Have to Give" (radio version) – 4:06
 "Quit Playing Games (with My Heart)" (live version) – 6:12
 "All I Have to Give" (The Conversation Mix) – 4:15
 "As Long as You Love Me" (Peppermint Jam Remix) – 3:42

 UK and European CD2 single
 "All I Have to Give" (radio version) – 4:06
 "We've Got It Goin' On" (CL's Anthem Radio Mix) – 4:12
 "Get Down (You're the One for Me)" (Markus Plastik Vocal) – 6:33
 "Quit Playing Games (with My Heart)" (E-Smoove Extended Vocal Version Mix) – 6:48

 Japanese enhanced CD single (EP)
 "All I Have to Give" (radio version)
 "Everybody (Backstreet's Back)" (7-inch version)
 "I'll Never Break Your Heart" (radio edit)
 "As Long as You Love Me" (radio version)
 "Everybody (Backstreet's Back)" (instrumental)
 "I'll Never Break Your Heart" (instrumental)
 "As Long as You Love Me" (Pepperment Jam Remix)

Charts

Weekly charts

Year-end charts

Certifications

Release history

References

1997 songs
1998 singles
Backstreet Boys songs
Jive Records singles
Music videos directed by Nigel Dick
Number-one singles in Hungary
Number-one singles in Spain
Pop ballads
UK Independent Singles Chart number-one singles